The Ministry of Sustainable Development and Infrastructure is a ministry of the Government of Luxembourg. Its head office is in the City of Luxembourg. As of 4 December 2013, François Bausch is the minister.

It was created on 23 July 2009 as the product of a merger between the positions of Ministry for the Environment, Ministry for Public Works, and Ministry for Transport.

Departments
The ministry includes several departments:
Department of the Environment (formerly Ministry of the Environment)
Public Works Department
Department of Spatial Planning
Department of Transport

The Public Procurement Directorate within the Public Works Department is responsible for the regulatory framework for public procurement, drafting relevant legislation and monitoring its implementation, and also for representing the Luxemburgish authorities in the field of public procurement.

References

External links

 Ministry of Sustainable Development and Infrastructure 

Ministries of Luxembourg
Sustainable Development and Infrastructure, Minister for the